Gooch Creek Arch is a natural sandstone arch in Rhea County, Tennessee. While the arch was first described by Wilbur Nelson in 1915, it could not be located by Corgan and Parks in 1979.

The landform is near the Laurel-Snow State Natural Area and the Cumberland Trail.

References

External links
 Gooch Creek Arch at Tennessee Landforms
 Cumberland Trail
 Laurel-Snow Natural Area at Tennessee.gov

Landforms of Rhea County, Tennessee
Landmarks in Tennessee
Natural arches of Tennessee